Alice Mary Wolkowicki (née Ellis, formerly Mulcaster and Tauber; 31 January 1905 – 12 March 1982), known professionally as Diana Napier, was an English film actress.

Biography
Napier was born in Bath, Somerset and died in Windlesham, Surrey, aged 77. Napier, known to her family as "Mollie", was married three times. Her first husband was the actor G. H. Mulcaster whom she married in 1927 and later divorced. Her second was the Austrian tenor, Richard Tauber (1891–1948), to whom she was married from 1936 until his death, and her third was the Polish artist, Stanislaw Wolkowicki (1902–1965), whom she had met during the war [when she worked for the Polish Red Cross] and married in 1953. He died in 1965, and she was buried with him in the Churchyard of St Michael and All Angels, Sunningdale, Berkshire in 1982.

Napier was the daughter of Major APB Ellis, an ENT specialist and sometime army surgeon, and Alice Napier. She took her mother's maiden name as her screen name. Having spent much of her childhood in South Africa, where she attended the Maris Stella School in Durban, the family returned to England and she embarked on a stage career. After a few years in repertory, she was offered a screen test by Alexander Korda, and made a few films before he dropped her. She then appeared in 1935 opposite Douglas Fairbanks, Jr. in Mimi, a film directed by Paul L. Stein, a childhood friend of Richard Tauber, who had directed Tauber's first British film Blossom Time in 1934. It was through Paul Stein she met Tauber, and appeared with him in three films made in 1935/36, the first of them, Heart's Desire, under Stein's direction. For five years, 1935 until 1940, she rented the Villa Capri at Elstree, where she lived with Tauber from the time of their marriage.

In April 1940 she joined the First Aid Nursing Yeomanry, and after basic training joined an Ambulance Unit in Scotland, where she cared for Polish Soldiers, eventually becoming an NCO in a Polish unit. She later joined the Polish Welfare Unit in London, early in 1945 she travelled to Holland with the Red Cross to care for Polish soldiers escaping from Germany, and after VE Day moved to Meppen in Germany, receiving a high commendation from General Clemens Rudnicki for her work on behalf of Polish Servicemen. [Details in her book 'My Heart and I', London, 1959, pages 155-177]

Shortly before Tauber's death, she set up an artist's studio in Beauchamp Place, which became the design and display company Diana Display Ltd. (later DNT Associates) based in Parsons Green, Fulham, London. She published a biography of her husband in 1949, a volume of autobiography (My Heart and I, 1959), and collaborated with Charles Castle on This was Richard Tauber, a book and a film issued in 1971 to mark what would have been Tauber's 80th birthday.

Selected filmography
 The Farmer's Wife (1928, credited as Mollie Ellis)
 Her First Affaire (1932)
 Strange Evidence (1933)
 For Love of You (1933)
 The Private Life of Don Juan (1934)
 The Rise of Catherine the Great (1934)
 The Warren Case (1934)
 Royal Cavalcade (1935)
 Mimi (1935)
 Falling in Love (1935)
 Heart's Desire (1935)
 Pagliacci (1936)
 Land Without Music (1936)
 Bait (1950)

References

External links

Grave in Sunningdale: https://www.findagrave.com/memorial/55863146

Sources
Daniel O'Hara. Richard Tauber: An Illustrated  Chronology richard-tauber.de; updated September 2022.[Now at https://www.richard-tauber.de]

Diana Napier Tauber, Richard Tauber, Arts and Educational Publishers Ltd, Glasgow and London, 1949
Diana Napier Tauber, My Heart and I, Evans Brothers, London, 1959
Charles Castle (with Diana Napier Tauber), This was Richard Tauber, W H Allen, London and New York, 1971

1905 births
1982 deaths
English film actresses
People from Bath, Somerset
20th-century English actresses